The Ashcombe School is a coeducational secondary school and sixth form located in Dorking in the English county of Surrey.

History
The Ashcombe School was established in 1976, by the merger of Dorking County Grammar School and Mowbray School. The co-educational Dorking County Grammar School had been founded in 1931 with the Amalgamation of the Dorking High School for Boys (1884–1930) and St.Martin's Church Of England High School for Girls opened in 1903. Mowbray Secondary Modern School for Girls opened on an adjacent site in 1953. The schools were close enough to share the school kitchen.

The Ashcombe School became a Specialist Language College in September 1998, allowing it to receive additional funding. It was featured in the Independent and the Guardian as a school that teaches Mandarin.

Previously a community school administered by Surrey County Council, in January 2017 The Ashcombe School converted to academy status. The school is now sponsored by the South East Surrey Schools Education Trust.

Notable former pupils

Dorking High School for Boys
 James Chuter Ede, Lord Chuter-Ede of Epsom, Labour MP and Home Secretary
 John Gandee, British diplomat; High Commissioner to Botswana from 1966 to 1969.

Dorking County Grammar School
 William Cole English conductor, composer and organist. Teacher at Dorking County School 1937-40
 Michael Colborne, Royal Navy officer and private secretary to Charles, Prince of Wales, and later the Duke of Westminster.
 Patricia Fothergill, pioneer in robotics and control languages, helped develop the Freddy II robot pioneer in robotics and robot control languages.
 Sir Stephen Lamport, Receiver General at Westminster Abbey, former diplomat and Deputy Private Secretary to the Prince of Wales. 
 Liz Lynne, Former Liberal Democrat MP and MEP
 Tom Mangold, award-winning BBC journalist and writer
 Sir Erich Reich, Kindertransport refugee,   Austrian born entrepreneur and charity fund raiser.

The Ashcombe School
 Evan Davis, economist and BBC journalist
 Jamie Mackie, Scotland international footballer

References

Educational institutions established in 1976
1976 establishments in England
Secondary schools in Surrey
Dorking
Academies in Surrey